Tai Jack Webster (born 29 May 1995) is a New Zealand professional basketball player for the Perth Wildcats of the National Basketball League (NBL). Prior to playing college basketball in the United States, Webster won a New Zealand NBL championship with the Auckland Pirates in 2012 and an Australian NBL championship with the Breakers in 2013 as a development player. He played four college seasons for the Nebraska Cornhuskers, earning second-team All-Big Ten as a senior in 2017. He played professionally in Germany and Turkey between 2017 and 2020.

Early career
Born in Auckland, Webster attended Westlake Boys High School where he led them to the National Secondary Schools Basketball Championships in October 2012, scoring 24 points en route to garnering tournament MVP honours. While attending Westlake, he played basketball for the North Harbour juniors; from 2010 to 2012, he played for the North Harbour U17s, U19s and U21s.

In 2012, Webster played for the Auckland Pirates, where in two games, he recorded a total of two points and two assists. The Pirates went on to win the 2012 championship with an 89–83 win over the Wellington Saints in the grand final.

In August 2012, Webster joined the New Zealand Breakers as a non-contracted development player for the 2012–13 NBL season. In December 2012, he signed a National Letter of Intent to play college basketball at the University of Nebraska–Lincoln.

In April 2013, Webster signed with the Waikato Pistons for the 2013 New Zealand NBL season. In 15 games for Waikato, he averaged 18.5 points, 3.9 rebounds, 4.4 assists and 2.0 steals per game. He had never heard of Nebraska when he was recruited, but signed with the team anyway.

College career

Freshman year
As a freshman for the Nebraska Cornhuskers in 2013–14, Webster was an immediate contributor, averaging 3.9 points, 2.1 rebounds and 2.0 assists in 32 games (30 starts) while helping the Huskers reach the NCAA Tournament for the first time since 1998. He led Nebraska with 63 assists and was also among the team leaders in steals. Webster reached double figures four times, including a season-high 14 points against Georgia, and paced the squad in assists eight times. His season-best was five assists on three occasions.

Sophomore year
As a sophomore in 2014–15, Webster emerged as one of for the Huskers , backing-up several starting guards Terran Petteway and Shavon Shields. He fell out of the rotation early in Big Ten play but found a role as the Huskers' energy guy off the bench and his improved defense showed in other facets of his game. In 30 games (four starts), he averaged 3.9 points, 1.9 rebounds and 1.2 assists in 18.4 minutes per game. Webster called the season "hugely disappointing" since his work in practice did not translate to higher production than as a freshman.  !

Junior year
As a junior in 2015–16, Webster joined the Nebraska starting lineup. He averaged 10.1 points, 4.1 rebounds and 1.9 assists in 27.7 minutes per game.

Senior year

As a senior in 2016–17, Webster averaged 17.0 points, 5.1 rebounds and 4.0 assists in 34.7 minutes per game. Leading up to the NBA draft, many thought Webster could be a "second-round sleeper."

College statistics

|-
| style="text-align:left;"| 2013–14
| style="text-align:left;"| Nebraska
| 32 || 30 || 22.8 || .304 || .171 || .619 || 2.1 || 2.0 || 0.8 || 0.1 || 3.9
|-
| style="text-align:left;"| 2014–15
| style="text-align:left;"| Nebraska
| 30 || 4 || 18.4 || .358 || .231 || .737 || 1.9 || 1.2 || 0.7 || 0.1 || 3.9
|-
| style="text-align:left;"| 2015–16
| style="text-align:left;"| Nebraska
| 34 || 18 || 27.7 || .474 || .350 || .740 || 4.1 || 1.9 || 1.4 || 0.4 || 10.1
|-
| style="text-align:left;"| 2016–17
| style="text-align:left;"| Nebraska
| 31 || 31 || 34.7 || .421 || .294 || .744 || 5.1 || 4.0 || 1.4 || 0.1 || 17.0
|-
| style="text-align:center;" colspan="2"|Career
| 127 || 83 || 25.9 || .414 || .279 || .715 || 3.3 || 2.3 || 1.0 || 0.2 || 8.8
|-

Professional career
After going undrafted in the 2017 NBA draft, Webster played for the Golden State Warriors during the 2017 NBA Summer League in Las Vegas. He later signed with the Skyliners Frankfurt in Germany for the 2017–18 season. He posted 14.9 points, 3.6 rebounds, and 3.8 assists per game in his rookie season.

On 7 August 2018, Webster signed with the Turkish team Galatasaray. He re-signed with Galatasaray on 7 August 2019.

On 15 July 2020, Webster signed a one-year contract with the New Zealand Breakers, returning to the team for a second stint. On 9 April 2021, he was ruled out for four weeks with an Achilles injury. Webster averaged 17.2 points, 4.9 rebounds, and 4.9 assists per game during the 2020–21 season.

On 11 July 2021, Webster re-signed with the Breakers on a two-year deal. However, on 20 September 2021, he was released by the Breakers reportedly due to his refusal to get the COVID-19 vaccine.

On 2 November 2021, Webster signed with Lithuanian team Žalgiris Kaunas for the rest of the 2021–22 season.

On 31 July 2022, Webster signed with Petkim Spor of the Turkish Basketball Super League. He was released on 30 December 2022.

On 2 January 2023, Webster signed with the Perth Wildcats in Australia for the rest of the 2022–23 NBL season, with a mutual option for the 2023–24 season.

National team career
In 2012, Webster represented New Zealand at the FIBA World Olympic Qualifying Tournament, where he averaged 13.5 points per game. He went on to represent New Zealand at the 2014 FIBA Basketball World Cup and the 2016 FIBA World Olympic Qualifying Tournament.

Career statistics

EuroLeague

|-
| align="left" | 2021–22
| align="left" | Žalgiris
| 21 || 7 || 12.5 || .326 || .222 || .739 || .9 || 1.6 || .3 || .1 || 4.0 || 2.0
|- class="sortbottom"
| align="center" colspan="2"| Career
| 21 || 7 || 12.5 || .326 || .222 || .739 || .9 || 1.6 || .3 || .1 || 4.0 || 2.0

Personal
Webster is the son of Tony and Cherry Webster. Tony was a standout athlete in his own right, earning first team All-WAC honors at Hawaii in 1983 and ranking fourth on Hawaii’s career steals list before playing professionally in New Zealand. His older brother, Corey, also plays professional basketball and the pair have been teammates.

References

External links
Tai Webster at euroleague.net (archive)
Tai Webster at euroleaguebasketball.net
Tai Webster at realgm.com
Tai Webster at huskers.com
Tai Webster at washingtonpost.com

"Breakers eye Tai Webster" at stuff.co.nz

1995 births
Living people
2014 FIBA Basketball World Cup players
2019 FIBA Basketball World Cup players
Auckland Pirates players
Basketball players from Auckland
BC Žalgiris players
Galatasaray S.K. (men's basketball) players
Nebraska Cornhuskers men's basketball players
New Zealand Breakers players
New Zealand expatriate basketball people in the United States
New Zealand expatriate basketball people in Germany
New Zealand expatriate basketball people in Lithuania
New Zealand expatriate basketball people in Turkey
New Zealand men's basketball players
Perth Wildcats players
Petkim Spor players
Point guards
Shooting guards
Skyliners Frankfurt players
Waikato Pistons players